The Journal of Statistical Mechanics: Theory and Experiment is a peer-reviewed scientific journal published by the International School for Advanced Studies and IOP Publishing. The journal is targeted to scientists interested in different aspects of statistical physics. The editor-in-chief is Marc Mézard (CNRS, University of Paris-Sud and École Normale Supérieure).

Abstracting and indexing 
The journal is abstracted and indexed in:

According to the Journal Citation Reports, the journal has a 2020 impact factor of 2.232.

References

External links
 

Physics journals
Publications established in 1922
Statistics journals
IOP Publishing academic journals
Monthly journals
English-language journals